Ponnampatti is a panchayat town in Tiruchirappalli district in the Indian state of Tamil Nadu.

Demographics
At the 2001 India census, Ponnampatti had a population of 10,659. Males constituted 49% of the population and females 51%. Ponnampatti had an average literacy rate of 65%, higher than the national average of 59.5%: male literacy was 75%, and female literacy was 55%. In Ponnampatti, 14% of the population was under 6 years of age.

References

Villages in Tiruchirappalli district